This is a list of television and radio broadcasters who have reported on the Birmingham Bowl, a college football bowl game played since 2006 in Birmingham, Alabama in the United States.

Television

Radio

References

Broadcasters
Birmingham
Birmingham Bowl
Birmingham Bowl
Birmingham Bowl
Birmingham, Alabama-related lists